Turandot is a 1926 opera by Giacomo Puccini. 

Other works of that title include:

 Turandot (Gozzi) (1762), play by Carlo Gozzi, and its many later adaptations
 Turandot Suite (1904-5), orchestral suite by Ferruccio Busoni
 Turandot (Busoni) (1917), opera by Ferruccio Busoni
 Turandot (Brecht) (1953/54), play by Bertolt Brecht

See also
 530 Turandot, a minor planet named for Puccini's character
 Crystal Turandot Award, a Russian theatre award created in 1991
 The Curse of Turandot, 2021 film, loosely based on Gozzi's play
 Princess Turandot (disambiguation)